Marizanne Kapp (born 4 January 1990) is a South African international cricketer who plays for South Africa national women's cricket team. She was the first cricketer for South Africa to take a hat-trick in a Women's Twenty20 International match.

Career
In December 2017, she was named as one of the players in the ICC Women's ODI Team of the Year.

In March 2018, she was one of fourteen players to be awarded a national contract by Cricket South Africa ahead of the 2018–19 season. In September 2018, she took her 100th wicket in WODIs, during the series against the West Indies.

In October 2018, she was named in South Africa's squad for the 2018 ICC Women's World Twenty20 tournament in the West Indies. She was the leading run-scorer for South Africa in the tournament, with 98 runs in four matches.

In November 2018, she was named in the Sydney Sixers' squad for the 2018–19 Women's Big Bash League season. In May 2019, in the first WODI against Pakistan, Kapp became the third cricketer for South Africa to play in 100 WODI matches.

In September 2019, she was named in the M van der Merwe XI squad for the inaugural edition of the Women's T20 Super League in South Africa. In January 2020, she was named in South Africa's squad for the 2020 ICC Women's T20 World Cup in Australia. On 23 July 2020, Kapp was named in South Africa's 24-woman squad to begin training in Pretoria, ahead of their tour to England. In 2021, she was drafted by Oval Invincibles for the inaugural season of The Hundred.

In February 2022, she was named in South Africa's team for the 2022 Women's Cricket World Cup in New Zealand. On 14 March 2022, in South Africa's World Cup match against England, Kapp took her first five-wicket haul in WODI cricket.

In April 2022, she was bought by the Oval Invincibles for the 2022 season of The Hundred in England. They later won the competition and she was named Player of the Match for her match-winning innings in the final.

In May 2022, she played two matches for the Falcons team at the 2022 FairBreak Invitational T20 in Dubai, United Arab Emirates. In the final of the Invitational, against the Tornadoes team, she made 67* with six fours and two sixes, and was awarded player of the match, but her outstanding performance was not enough to prevent the Tornadoes from winning the tournament.

In June 2022, in the one-off Test against England, Kapp scored her first century in Test cricket, with 150 runs. Her total was also  the highest individual score for South Africa in a women's Test match. In July 2022, she was named in South Africa's team for the cricket tournament at the 2022 Commonwealth Games in Birmingham, England. However, Kapp was later ruled out of the tournament due to family reasons.

Personal life
In July 2018, she married her teammate and captain of the South African Women's cricket team Dane van Niekerk.

References

External links
 
 

1990 births
Living people
South Africa women One Day International cricketers
South Africa women Test cricketers
South Africa women Twenty20 International cricketers
South African women cricketers
Cricketers from Port Elizabeth
Women's Twenty20 International cricket hat-trick takers
East Coast women cricketers
Eastern Province women cricketers
Northerns women cricketers
Surrey women cricketers
Surrey Stars cricketers
Sydney Sixers (WBBL) cricketers
ACT Meteors cricketers
South African LGBT sportspeople
LGBT cricketers
Lesbian sportswomen
Oval Invincibles cricketers
Perth Scorchers (WBBL) cricketers
Delhi Capitals (WPL) cricketers